Elmwood is a historic 19th century estate at 16311 Kendle Road, northeast of Williamsport in Washington County, Maryland.  The elegant Greek Revival estate house was built in 1855 by James Downey, a canal merchant.  The  remnant of Downey's estate includes a 19th-century barn, milking barn, and hog barn.

The estate was listed on the National Register of Historic Places in 2012.

See also
National Register of Historic Places listings in Washington County, Maryland

References

External links
, including undated photo, at Maryland Historical Trust

Houses on the National Register of Historic Places in Maryland
Greek Revival houses in Maryland
Houses in Washington County, Maryland
National Register of Historic Places in Washington County, Maryland